William "Willie/Smokey" Saunders (April 13, 1915 – July 30, 1986) was a Canadian Horse Racing Hall of Fame jockey in Thoroughbred horse racing and one of only ten jockeys to win the United States Triple Crown of Thoroughbred Racing.

Saunders was known as "Willie" but the news media frequently refers to him as "Smokey/Smoky."

Horse Racing and Military Career 
Saunders earned his first win at Tanforan Racetrack in northern California on April 14, 1932. Competing at tracks in southern California, Alberta-born U.S. Racing Hall of Fame jockey George Woolf tutored Saunders on riding.

During his career, Saunders rode for prominent owners such as Wheatley Stable, Hal Price Headley, and William Woodward. He won the 1934 Rochambeau Handicap at Narragansett Park aboard Woodward's Belair Stud colt Faireno, who was trained by "Sunny Jim" Fitzsimmons. Fitzsimmons put Saunders aboard the colt Omaha, and in 1935 they won the U.S. Triple Crown with victories in the Kentucky Derby, Preakness Stakes, and Belmont Stakes. In 1935, Saunders also won the inaugural edition of the Santa Anita Oaks aboard Dunlin Lady. After his rise to fame as a jockey, he also had a minor role in the comedic film Mr. Celebrity (1941) in which he played himself.

Weight problems interrupted his career, as did the outbreak of World War II when he joined the United States Army and served overseas in the Pacific Theater. During his four years in the military, a bout of malaria, contracted while overseas, resulted in considerable weight loss that allowed him to resume his career in racing once the war ended. In 1948, Saunders rode Bovard to victory in the Louisiana Derby, then rode the colt to a third-place finish in the Preakness Stakes.

Saunders retired in 1950 and later served as a racing official at tracks in Florida, Illinois, and New Jersey.

When his riding career ended in 1950, Saunders worked as a trainer before becoming a placing judge at racetracks in Illinois, New Jersey, and Calder Race Course in Florida.

On its formation in 1976,  Saunders was inducted into the Canadian Horse Racing Hall of Fame.

Personal life 
Born in Calgary, Alberta, at age eighteen Saunders moved to Bozeman, Montana where he joined the household of an uncle. He learned to ride in Alberta and in Montana.

On June 29, 1936, he married Pauline Waterbury of Detroit.

Living in Hallandale, Florida, five weeks after being diagnosed with cancer of the brain and lungs, he died in a Naples, Florida, hospital on July 30, 1986, at age 71.

References

 May 13, 1935 TIME magazine article on Willie Saunders win in the  Kentucky Derby
 August 1, 1986 The Evening Independent obituary for Willie Saunders
 William (Smokey) Saunders at the Canadian Horse Racing Hall of Fame

1915 births
1986 deaths
United States Army personnel of World War II
Canadian jockeys
Canadian Horse Racing Hall of Fame inductees
American jockeys
People from Bozeman, Montana
Sportspeople from Calgary
People from Hallandale Beach, Florida
Deaths from brain cancer in the United States
Deaths from lung cancer in Florida